Hoove is a hill in the northern Yorkshire Dales in North Yorkshire, England, near the town of Barnard Castle in County Durham.

Marilyns of England
Peaks of the Yorkshire Dales